Fossett is a surname. Notable people with the surname include:

Robert George John Francis Fossett (1922–2004), English clown
Steve Fossett (1944–2007), American businessman, aviator, sailor, and adventurer

See also
24654 Fossett, Mars-crossing asteroid